La Cresta is a census-designated place (CDP) in the Santa Rosa Plateau region in Riverside County, California, United States. It is situated west of Murrieta, north of Temecula and the San Diego County Border, and east of Orange County. It is centrally located approximately 55 miles from Downtown San Diego, 65 miles from Downtown Los Angeles, and 15 miles from the Pacific Ocean. The population of La Cresta is approximately 2,860.

History

Like many areas in California, prior to being developed, La Cresta was home to native American tribes whose artifacts and remnants can still be found today. Unlike the neighboring cities of Murrieta and Temecula which experienced significant growth in the late 1880s, early 1900s, and throughout the 1990s, La Cresta remained largely undisturbed. In 1971, as the valley matured and more people moved in, Dan Stephenson, Founder and Chairman of the Rancon Group, moved into land and estate sales. One of his first major developments was La Cresta. Stephenson’s group master-planned La Cresta to include estate properties linked by riding and walking trails. The venture was a success and set the tone for future area development including the La Cresta Highlands and Santa Rosa West.

About

La Cresta is characterized by its exclusive equestrian ranches and large luxurious estates. Comprising 5,900-acres, La Cresta is made up of five separate Home Owner Associations including: La Cresta, La Cresta Highlands, Santa Rosa West, The Trails, and Meadow Oaks.

Despite a number of ranches and estates in the community, much of La Cresta remains in its natural undeveloped state. Expansive views of the Cleveland National Forest, Santa Rosa Plateau, Santa Ana Mountains, Mount Palomar, and Pacific Ocean are commonplace. Groves of ancient oak trees and meandering spring-fed creeks dot the valleys as green orchards and vineyards quilt the rolling hills. Sitting at an elevation between 1,800 and 2,700 feet above sea level, La Cresta benefits from a temperate year-round climate that is approximately 10 degrees cooler than the Murrieta/Temecula Valley. 

La Cresta is home to a vast wildlife population including California mule deer, coyotes, mountain lions, bobcats, gray fox, jackrabbits, snakes, racoons, squirrels, and skunks. Bird populations in the community are healthy and plentiful and include several species of hawks, golden eagle, owls, and numerous songbirds.  
 
The Trails
La Cresta
La Cresta Highlands
Santa Rosa West
Meadow Oaks

Unincorporated communities in Riverside County, California
Unincorporated communities in California